Newsboys Remixed is the first full remix album by Christian pop/rock group Newsboys, which includes remixes of some of their most popular songs, as well as some reworked versions of songs from their most recent studio album, Thrive.

Track listing

Note
"Thrive" (Is That James Dancing? Mix)
Billboard Hot Dance Singles Sales Peak: No. 18 (12 weeks on chart)

References 

Newsboys albums
2002 remix albums
Sparrow Records remix albums